Derailments is a Canadian documentary film, directed by Chelsea McMullan and released in 2011. The film profiles Italian cartoonist Milo Manara, and his reminiscences about creating a comics version of Federico Fellini's unfinished film Il Viaggio di Mastorna detto Fernet.

The film was a Genie Award nominee for Best Short Documentary Film at the 32nd Genie Awards.

References

External links
 

2011 films
2011 short documentary films
Canadian short documentary films
Films directed by Chelsea McMullan
2010s Canadian films